Reginald of Bar, also known as Renaud de Mouçon, was bishop of Chartres from 1182 until his death in 1217.  His parents were Reginald II of Bar and his wife Adèle de Champagne.  Via his mother he was first cousin to king Philip II of France, who facilitated his career.  He was named canon and treasurer of Saint-Martin de Tours and was then elected bishop of Chartres in 1182.  He played an important role in France and Champagne and participated in the Third Crusade.

Returning to France, in 1199 he negotiated the marriage of Theobald III of Champagne to Blanche of Navarre.  After Theobald's death and during Blanche's regency, he held great influence in the court at Champagne.  During the Champagne War of Succession he was part of a tribunal charged with ruling on the succession.  In 1210 he led a detachment of crusaders in the Albigensian Crusade and participated in the siege of Termes.

References

1217 deaths
Bishops of Chartres
Christians of the Third Crusade
People of the Albigensian Crusade
Year of birth unknown
Armed priests